Sportske Novosti award is an annual football award established in 2001 by the Croatian daily sports newspaper Sportske novosti. It is awarded to the highest polling football player. The newspaper polls top coaches and players for the occasion.

Winners

References

Awards established in 2001
Croatia
Croatian awards